Børgin or Borgenfjorden is a fjord branch in the eastern part of Trondheimsfjorden in the municipalities of Steinkjer and Inderøy in Trøndelag county, Norway. The mouth of the fjord is by the village of Straumen and there is a bridge across the fjord at its narrowest point.

See also
 List of Norwegian fjords

References

Fjords of Trøndelag
Steinkjer
Inderøy